The Victoria Hospital was a health facility in Queen's Road, Richmond, North Yorkshire, England. It is now used as a funeral director's offices and remains a Grade II listed building.

History
The facility, which was created by converting an early 19th century neo-gothic style house into a hospital, opened as the Richmond Cottage Hospital in 1899. It joined the National Health Service in 1948. After services were transferred to modern facilities at the Friary Community Hospital in 1999, the Victoria Hospital closed and the building was converted for use as a funeral director's offices.

References

Hospitals established in 1899
1899 establishments in England
Hospital buildings completed in 1899
Hospitals in North Yorkshire
Defunct hospitals in England
Richmond, North Yorkshire